Stanisław Chlebowski (1835–1884) was a Polish painter with Russian and Turkish connections. He was a renowned specialist in Oriental themes.

Biography
Chlebowski was born in the Ushitsky Uyezd of the Podolian Governorate of the Russian Empire (now Khmelnyskyi Raion, Ukraine), and learned drawing in Grekov Odessa Art school. Between 1853 and 1859, he studied at the Academy of Fine Arts in St. Petersburg, and then on a scholarship for six years in Paris as the pupil of the French Orientalist painter Jean-Léon Gérôme. Chlebowski traveled to Spain, Italy, Germany, and Belgium.  His first success was selling his painting Joanne d’Arc in Amiens Prison to Napoleon III of France.

In the years 1864-1876 Chlebowski was the master painter under the service of Sultan Abdülaziz and took up residence in Constantinople. Chlebowski became popular in the empire. During his services, he had obtained permission to bring with him a large icon of Mother of God Leading Our Way having been rescued from the Hodegon Monastery in 1453. He had come across it in one of the antique stores in Constantinople, untouched by its Turkish conservator.

In 1876 he moved to Paris. In 1881 he returned permanently to Krakow. The subject matter of his watercolours and oil paintings is diverse. He painted images of historical battles related to the history of Turkey and Ottoman Empire, oriental genre scenes, landscapes, and portraits of Ottoman sultans.
He died near Posen, in Rundhausen (in the German Empire) at age 49.

Chlebowski lived abroad for a long time and as a result his paintings were very rare in Poland.

Selected works 
Entry of Sultan Mehmed II to Constantinople at the Gate of the City (1873)
Turkish sentry (1880)
The time of prayer
Sultan Bayezid in captivity of Tamerlane (1878)

See also
 List of Orientalist artists
 Orientalism

References 
Inline

General

 "Stanisław Chlebowski" Agra Art, retrieved on August 3, 2008.
 Stanisław Chlebowski images of works on auction, retrieved on August 3, 2008.
 Auctioned works by Chlebowski database, artistsearch.com, retrieved on August 4, 2008.

1835 births
1884 deaths
People from Khmelnytskyi Oblast
People from Ushitsky Uyezd
People from the Russian Empire of Polish descent
Clan of Poraj
19th-century Polish painters
19th-century Polish male artists
Orientalist painters
Polish male painters